Jennifer Lynne Skeem is an American psychologist and the Mack Distinguished Professor in the UC Berkeley School of Social Welfare, where she is also the Associate Dean of Research. She is also a professor at the University of California, Berkeley's Goldman School of Public Policy. Her research focuses on criminal justice and behavioral science, including how to improve the ways that the criminal justice system treats people with mental illness. From 2013 to 2014, she was the president of the American Psychology-Law Society. Since 2013, she has been a fellow of the Association for Psychological Science.

References

External links
Faculty page at the Goldman School of Public Policy

Living people
American women psychologists
21st-century American psychologists
Forensic psychologists
University of Utah alumni
University of California, Berkeley School of Social Welfare faculty
Goldman School of Public Policy faculty
Fellows of the Association for Psychological Science
Year of birth missing (living people)
21st-century American women